College Football Scoreboard is a program on ESPN, ESPN2, and ABC that provides up-to-the-minute scores, highlights, pre-game and post-game interviews, and check-ins of games of interest through 'bonus coverage' during the college football season throughout each Saturday. The name of the show was College Gameday Scoreboard until 2006. 

Airing several times throughout Saturday, it is often a transition program between the early afternoon and late afternoon games, along with primetime games before Saturday Night Football/ESPN College Football Primetime, then late night Western matchups. In practice, it is subject to being, and often is, pre-empted, due to earlier games running long into the show's timeslot, and often games run into each other without any kind of Scoreboard interlude. Conversely, a week with few ESPN-contracted games and those games being influenced by outside events such as weather delays or game cancellations can rarely cause the show to run the length of an entire game.

ESPN's version is hosted by Matt Barrie along with analysis from Joey Galloway and Jesse Palmer (who also appeared on the late night College Football Final). 
The ESPN2 version is hosted by Kevin Connors with analysis from Dan Mullen and Sam Acho. 
On ABC, it is hosted by their studio team of Kevin Negandhi and Booger McFarland.

See also
College GameDay
College Football Final
ESPN College Football Primetime

References

ESPN original programming
ESPN2 original programming
2010s American television series
2001 American television series debuts
College football studio shows